Youth of China can refer to:

Youth of China (EP), a 2008 EP by Li Yuchun
Youth of China (film), a 1937 patriotic Hong Kong film
Youth of China (1940 film), with Bai Yang
Wah Ching, a Chinese American criminal organization founded in San Francisco, California

See also
Communist Youth League of China
Young Pioneers of China